Mudface is the eighth solo studio album by American rapper Redman. It was released on November 13, 2015 through Gilla House Records. Recording sessions took place at Gilla House Studios. Production was handled by Boris Milanov, Desmond "Dez" Peterson, Illmind, Jahlil Beats, Labor Department, Marvel, Mike & Keys, Rick Rock, Rockwilder, Sebastian Arman, Theory Hazit, and Redman himself, who also served as executive producer. It features guest appearances from Ready Roc, Runt Dog, Stressmatic and Josh Gannet. The album peaked at number 147 on the Billboard 200 and number 13 on the Top R&B/Hip-Hop Albums in the United States.

Track listing

Personnel
Reginald "Reggie" Noble – main artist, producer (tracks: 1, 3, 5), engineering, executive producer, A&R
Josh Gannet – featured artist (track 1), mixing, mastering
Thomas "Stressmatic" Jackson – featured artist (track 7)
Armon "Ready Roc" Johnson – featured artist (track 12)
Runt Dawg – featured artist (track 12)
Dana "Rockwilder" Stinson – producer (track 2)
Labor Department – producer (track 4)
Michael Ray Cox, Jr. – producer (track 6)
John "J-Keys" Groover – producer (track 6)
Ricardo "Rick Rock" Thomas – producer (track 7)
Orlando "Jahlil Beats" Tucker – producer (track 8)
Thearthur "Theory Hazit" Washington – producer (track 9)
Boris Milanov – producer (track 10)
Sebastian Arman – producer (track 10)
Desmond J. Peterson – producer (track 11)
Ramon "Illmind" Ibanga, Jr. – producer (track 12)
Marvel Da Beat Bandit – producer (track 13)
Dom Dirtee – artwork, design
James Ellis – management
Tariq Zaid – A&R
DMG Music Clearances – sample clearance

Charts

References

External links

2015 albums
Redman (rapper) albums
Albums produced by Illmind
Albums produced by Rick Rock
Albums produced by Rockwilder
Albums produced by Jahlil Beats